Anthony James Crossley (born 3 May 1939) is a Rhodesian former sailor. He competed in the Flying Dutchman event at the 1964 Summer Olympics.

References

External links
 

1939 births
Living people
Rhodesian male sailors (sport)
Olympic sailors of Rhodesia
Sailors at the 1964 Summer Olympics – Flying Dutchman
Place of birth missing (living people)